Per Savilahti-Nagander, commonly referred to as Per Savilahti, (born April 22, 1985) is a Swedish professional ice hockey defenceman. He currently plays for SaiPa in the Finnish Liiga.

Savilahti has formerly played with hometown club, Luleå HF in the Swedish Hockey League (SHL). During the 2015–16 season, while in his third tenure with Luleå, Savilahti appeared in just 14 games for 2 assists before opting to return to SaiPa of the Liiga on November 21, 2015.

References

External links

1985 births
Living people
AIK IF players
IF Björklöven players
Luleå HF players
Piteå HC players
SaiPa players
Swedish people of Finnish descent
Swedish ice hockey defencemen
People from Luleå
Sportspeople from Norrbotten County